National Highway 46 (NH 46) is a primary National Highway in India. This highway is in the state of Madhya Pradesh, running from Gwalior to Betul. Before renumbering of national highways, NH-46 was variously numbered as old national highways 3, 12 & 69.

Route 

NH46 connects Gwalior, Shivpuri, Guna, Biaora, Bhopal, Obedullaganj, Hoshangabad and terminates at Betul in the state of Madhya Pradesh.

Junctions  
 
  Terminal near Gwalior.
  near Shivpuri
  near guna
  near Guna
  near Jharkheda
  near Bhopal
  near Bhopal
  near Obedullaganj
  near Budhni
  Terminal near Betul

Asian Highways
Gwalior to Biora stretch of National Highway 46 is part of Asian Highway 47. From Biora AH47 continues along NH52 .

See also 
 List of National Highways in India
 List of National Highways in India by state

References

External links
NH 46 on OpenStreetMap

National highways in India
National Highways in Madhya Pradesh